Zhefarovich Crag (‘Zhefarovich Kamak’ \zhe-'fa-ro-vich 'ka-m&k\) is the sharp rocky peak rising to 1015 m in the west foothills of Hemimont Plateau on Fallières Coast in Graham Land, Antarctica. It surmounts Swithinbank Glacier to the southwest and Kom Glacier to the north.

The peak is named "after the Bulgarian and Serbian painter, engraver, writer and poet Hristofor Zhefarovich (1690–1753)."

Location
British mapping in 1978.

Maps
Antarctic Digital Database (ADD). Scale 1:250000 topographic map of Antarctica. Scientific Committee on Antarctic Research (SCAR). Since 1993, regularly upgraded and updated.
British Antarctic Territory. Scale 1:200000 topographic map. DOS 610 Series, Sheet W 67 66. Directorate of Overseas Surveys, Tolworth, UK, 1978.

Notes

References
 Bulgarian Antarctic Gazetteer. Antarctic Place-names Commission. (details in Bulgarian, basic data in English)
 Zhefarovich Crag. SCAR Composite Antarctic Gazetteer

External links
 Zhefarovich Crag. Copernix satellite image

Mountains of Graham Land
Bulgaria and the Antarctic
Fallières Coast